The Scânteia train accident occurred on August 14, 2009 at 14:10 local time (UTC+3) when at least 14 people died after a collision between a minibus and a train in Scânteia, Iași County, Romania on County Road 248C. The death toll was initially reported as 10. It was the worst accident in Romania in fifteen years.

Accident

A minibus, with 16 people on board, was hit by a train at a railway crossing in the county of Iași, near the town of Scânteia. According to Under-Secretary of State for Health Raed Arafat, 14 people died, including the driver and a child, and three were seriously injured. The bus, which was hit in the centre, was pushed 350 m to Scânteia train station. The train stopped about 350 meters after the impact. Train traffic in the region came to a standstill for a time.

The train involved in the accident was operated by private rail company Regiotrans and ran between Iași and Brașov.

Victims
All of those dead and injured were on the bus; the train passengers were unhurt. According to sources cited, some of the passengers were thrown out the vehicle following the impact, while others remained trapped in the minibus. The bus driver, whose age was variously reported as 21 or 26, and the other injured persons were reported to be in a state of traumatic coma.

Cause
According to the Iași police, the accident occurred because the minibus driver failed to comply with light signals and signs at the railway crossing. The driver died two days later after sustaining fatal injuries.

See also
 List of road accidents 2000–2009

References

External links
 Photos and videos  on the accident (CONTAINS BLOODY IMAGES).

2009 in Romania
Bus incidents in Romania
2009 road incidents
Iași County
Level crossing incidents in Romania
Railway accidents in 2009
August 2009 events in Europe
2009 disasters in Romania